The Tanpō Railway (Japanese: 端豊鉄道株式会社, Tanpō Tetsudō Kabushiki Kaisha; Korean: 단풍철도주식회사, Danpung Cheoldo Jusikhoesa), was a privately owned railway company in Japanese-occupied Korea.

History
The name of the railway was formed from the first characters of the names of the starting point, Tansen on the Kankyō Line of the Chōsen Government Railway, and Hōzan, the county seat of Hōzan County. The initial section of the mainline,  from Tansen to Kōkun, was opened on 26 August 1939. A  branchline from Kojō (now called Heocheon) to Mantoku was also opened, but the planned continuation from Kōkun to Hōzan was not completed before the fall of Japan at the end of the Pacific War.

Following the partition of Korea, the entirety of the Danpung Railway's network was located in the Soviet zone of occupation. The Provisional People’s Committee for North Korea nationalised all railways in the northern half of the country on 10 August 1946, and following the establishment of North Korea, the Korean State Railway was created, which renamed the line Hŏch'ŏn Line. Damage sustained by the line during the Korean War was repaired, but the extension to Pungsan (renamed Kimhyonggwonin 1990) was never built.

Services
In the November 1942 timetable, the last issued prior to the start of the Pacific War, the Tanpō Railway was running three trains each day from Tansen to Kōkun, and four each day on the return trip.

Rolling Stock
One Class 4110 steam locomotive was sent from the Japanese Government Railway to the Danpung Railway after conversion to standard gauge.

Network

References

Rail transport in North Korea
Rail transport in Korea
Korea under Japanese rule
Defunct railway companies of Japan
Defunct railway companies of Korea